Poland competed at the 2002 Winter Olympics in Salt Lake City, United States. The two medals won by Adam Małysz were the first for Poland in the Winter Olympic Games since 1972.

Medalists

Alpine skiing

Men

Biathlon

Men

Women

Bobsleigh

Men

Cross-country skiing

Distance

Sprint

Figure skating

Short track speed skating

Men

Ski jumping

Snowboarding

Halfpipe

Slalom

Speed skating

Men

Women

References
Official Olympic Reports
International Olympic Committee results database
 Olympic Winter Games 2002, full results by sports-reference.com

Nations at the 2002 Winter Olympics
2002
Winter Olympics, Poland at